Guillaume Krommenhoek (born 11 July 1992) is a Dutch rower. After he quit his American Football career he started rowing in 2015 at students rowing association A.A.S.R. Skoll. He competed in the men's coxless pair at the 2020 Summer Olympics. Currently he is the stroke of the men's eight that won a silver medal at the 2022 World Rowing Championships. He is preparing to compete in his second consecutive Olympics in Paris in 2024.

References

External links

1992 births
Living people
Dutch male rowers
Rowers at the 2020 Summer Olympics
Olympic rowers of the Netherlands
Rowers from Amsterdam
World Rowing Championships medalists for the Netherlands